If My Friends Could See Me Now is the second studio album recorded by American singer Linda Clifford, released in 1978 on the Curtom label.

Chart performance
The album peaked at No. 9 on the R&B albums chart. It also reached No. 22 on the Billboard 200. The album features a disco-styled cover version of the title track, which peaked at No. 68 on the Hot Soul Singles chart and No. 54 on the Billboard Hot 100. Another single, "Runaway Love", also charted at No. 3 on the Hot Soul Singles chart and No. 76 on the Billboard Hot 100. Both tracks, along with the track "Gypsy Lady" peaked at No. 1 on the Hot Dance/Disco chart.

Track listing

Personnel
Keni Burke – bass guitar
Calvin Bridges, Rich Tufo, Eric Hackett – keyboards
Eric Hackett – synthesizer
Donnell Hagan – drums
Curtis Mayfield, Ronnie Vann, William Ross Traut – guitars
The Jones Girls – background vocals
Sol Bobrov – horns and strings contractor

Charts

Weekly charts

Year-end charts

Singles

References

External links
 

1978 albums
Linda Clifford albums
Albums produced by Gil Askey
Albums produced by Curtis Mayfield
Curtom Records albums